Bert Goedkoop (born February 15, 1956) is a Dutch volleyball player and coach. Among his accomplishments, he was head coach of the 2001 Dutch national men's team when it took 7th at the World League finals in Katowice and head coach of the Netherlands women's national volleyball team when it took the 1995 European Championship.

References
 FIVB Profile

1956 births
Living people
Dutch volleyball coaches
National team coaches
Dutch men's volleyball players
Place of birth missing (living people)

Sportspeople from Amstelveen